The Woody Woodpecker and Friends Classic Cartoon Collection: Volume 2 is a three-disc DVD collection of theatrical cartoons starring Woody Woodpecker and the other Lantz characters, produced by Walter Lantz Productions for Universal Pictures between 1932 and 1965. The set was released by Universal Studios Home Entertainment on April 15, 2008. Included in the set are seventy-five cartoon shorts, including the next forty-five Woody Woodpecker cartoons, continuing the production order from Volume 1. The other thirty cartoons include five Andy Panda shorts, five Chilly Willy shorts,  five Oswald the Lucky Rabbit shorts, five Musical Favorites, and ten Cartune Classics.

DVD contents

Disc One
Woody Woodpecker
1952:
Termites from Mars
1953:
What's Sweepin'
Buccaneer Woodpecker
Operation Sawdust
Wrestling Wrecks
Belle Boys
Hypnotic Hick
Hot Noon (or 12 O'Clock For Sure)
1954:
Socko in Morocco
Alley to Bali
Under the Counter Spy
Hot Rod Huckster
Real Gone Woody
A Fine Feathered Frenzy
Convict Concerto
Oswald the Lucky Rabbit
Carnival Capers (1932)
Five and Dime (1933)
Wax Works (1934)
Springtime Serenade (1935)
Puppet Show (1936)
Cartune Classics
She Done Him Right (1933)
Jolly Little Elves (1934)
Candyland (1935)
A Haunting We Will Go (1939)
Fair Today (1941)
Bonus Features:
6 “Behind the Scenes with Walter Lantz” segments from The Woody Woodpecker Show.

Disc two
Woody Woodpecker
1955:
Helter Shelter
Witch Crafty
Private Eye Pooch
Bedtime Bedlam
Square Shootin' Square
Bunco Busters
The Tree Medic
1956:
After the Ball
Get Lost
Chief Charlie Horse
Woodpecker from Mars
Calling All Cuckoos
Niagara Fools
Arts and Flowers
Woody Meets Davy Crewcut
Andy Panda
100 Pygmies and Andy Panda (1940)
The Painter and the Pointer (1944)
The Poet and Peasant (1946)
Mousie Come Home (1946)
Dog Tax Dodgers (1948)
Musical Favorites
The Hams That Couldn't Be Cured (1942)
Juke Box Jamboree (1942)
Boogie Woogie Man (1943)
The Overture to William Tell (1947)
Pixie Picnic (1948)
Bonus features:
Six “Behind the Scenes with Walter Lantz” segments produced for The Woody Woodpecker Show
Rare TV Pilot Episodes: “The Secret Weapon” and  “Jungle Medics”

Disc three
Woody Woodpecker
1957:
Red Riding Hoodlum
Box Car Bandit
The Unbearable Salesman
International Woodpecker
To Catch a Woodpecker
Round Trip to Mars
Dopey Dick the Pink Whale
Fodder and Son
1958:
Misguided Missile
Watch the Birdie
Half Empty Saddles
His Better Elf
Everglade Raid
Tree’s a Crowd
Jittery Jester
Chilly Willy
Hold That Rock (1956)
Operation Cold Feet (1957)
Clash and Carry (1961)
Deep Freeze Squeeze (1964)
Half Baked Alaska (1965)
Cartune Co-Stars
Maw and Paw (1953)
A Horse's Tale (1954)
Dig That Dog (1954)
The Ostrich Egg and I (1956)
Salmon Yeggs (1958)
Bonus feature:
The Woody Woodpecker Show: Episode #47: contains Ballyhooey (Woody Woodpecker, 1960), Rough and Tumbleweed (1961), Franken-Stymied (Woody Woodpecker, 1961), and Mother's Little Helper (1962)

References 
Official DVD website
Information on the shorts and the years they were released

Woody Woodpecker